Colly Barnes Ezeh, commonly known as Colly, also known as Steve (born 10 December 1979) is a Nigerian-born Hong Kong football player.

Career

Club career
When he was in Mohun Bagan AC, he only played in cup matches.

International career
As of 15 July 2010.

Honours

Happy Valley
 Hong Kong First Division League: 2005–06

Individual
 Dhaka League top scorer: 2002

External links
 Profile on the fansite of Happy Valley AA
 News story  on Hkfreearea.com

References

1979 births
Living people
Hong Kong footballers
Hong Kong international footballers
Nigerian footballers
Nigerian emigrants to Hong Kong
Expatriate footballers in Bangladesh
Expatriate footballers in India
Nigerian expatriate sportspeople in India
Hong Kong First Division League players
Happy Valley AA players
Mutual FC players
Shatin SA players
Sun Hei SC players
Tuen Mun SA players
Hong Kong people of Nigerian descent
People with acquired permanent residency of Hong Kong
Association football forwards
Association football defenders
Naturalized footballers of Hong Kong
Hong Kong League XI representative players
Calcutta Football League players